Kumbadaje  is a village in Kasaragod district in the state of Kerala, India.

Demographics
As of 2011 Census, Kumbadaje had a population of 11,161 with 5,588 males and 5,573 females. In Kumbadaje, 11.9% of the population was under 6 years of age. Kumbadaje had an average literacy of 86.23% higher than the national average of 74% and lower than the state average of 94%: male literacy was 91.63% and female literacy was 80.8%.

References

Suburbs of Kasaragod